Carex godfreyi is a tussock-forming species of perennial sedge in the family Cyperaceae. It is native to south eastern parts of the United States.

See also
List of Carex species

References

godfreyi
Plants described in 1993
Flora of Florida
Flora of Georgia
Flora of North Carolina
Flora of South Carolina
Flora of Alabama